Pauke is both a given name and a surname. Notable people with the name include:

Pauke Meijers (1934–2013), Dutch football player
Pauke Siaka (born 1986), Papua New Guinean cricketer
Florian Baucke (also Pauke; 1719–1779), Silesian and Bohemian Jesuit missionary

See also
Baucke
Bauke